Bangiophyceae is a class of red algae. In some classifications it is merged with the Florideophyceae to form the Rhodophyceae. The Bangiophyceae, as defined traditionally, are paraphyletic. Their taxonomic identification has been difficult because of a lack of distinct morphological features, and the presumed morphological plasticity of the species.  Molecular tools are required to elucidate the relationships within this assemblage.

It is still used by some sources, and defined sensu stricto (including Bangia and Porphyra but not the species included in Florideophyceae) is considered a valid clade.

References

 
Red algae classes